Mamamusic is a Ukrainian record label. The company is a privately owned and operated by Yurii Nikitin.

Overview 
On December 9, 1999, Yuri Nikitin, then CEO of Nova Management, founded Mamamusic, which now handles copyright, as well as providing production services and recording songs for Ukrainian and foreign artists.

Mamamusic company is engaged in activities that cover almost all areas of show business:

 promo support for artists and PR;
 digital sale of music content - mobile devices, the Internet;
 legal protection of performers' interests, copyright;
 organization of concert activities;
 sale of rights to use the image of artists in sponsorship and advertising activities.

Supported artists and groups

Present 

 Verka Serdyuchka
 Olha Horbachova
 KAZKA
 Roxolana

Former 

 Iryna Bilyk, the People's Artist of Ukraine
 Skryabin (band)
 Dasha Astafieva
 Aviator
 NikitA
 neAngely

References

Ukrainian record labels
Record labels established in 1992
Ukrainian brands
Pop record labels
Rock record labels